Fabiana Beltrame (born 9 April 1982 in Florianópolis) is a former Brazilian rower. She has competed in three Summer Olympics – Athens 2004, Beijing 2008 in the single scull, and London 2012 in the double sculls (with Luana De Assis).  She won the 2011 World Rowing Championships in Bled, Slovenia, and competes in the Lightweight class.

References

External links
 
 

1982 births
Living people
Brazilian female rowers
Olympic rowers of Brazil
Rowers at the 2004 Summer Olympics
Rowers at the 2008 Summer Olympics
Rowers at the 2011 Pan American Games
Rowers at the 2012 Summer Olympics
Pan American Games silver medalists for Brazil
Rowers at the 2015 Pan American Games
Sportspeople from Florianópolis
World Rowing Championships medalists for Brazil
Pan American Games medalists in rowing
South American Games gold medalists for Brazil
South American Games silver medalists for Brazil
South American Games medalists in rowing
Competitors at the 2010 South American Games
Competitors at the 2014 South American Games
Medalists at the 2011 Pan American Games
Medalists at the 2015 Pan American Games
21st-century Brazilian women